Connecticut's 114th House of Representatives district elects one member of the Connecticut House of Representatives. It encompasses parts of Derby, Orange, and Woodbridge. It has been represented by Democrat Mary Welander since 2021.

List of representatives

Recent elections

2020

2018

2016

2014

2012

References

114